Châteauguay is a provincial riding (electoral district) in the Montérégie region of Quebec, Canada, that elects members to the National Assembly of Quebec. It notably includes the city of Châteauguay.

It was originally created in 1867 (and an electoral district of that name existed earlier in the Legislative Assembly of the Province of Canada).  Its final election was in 1936.  It disappeared in the 1939 and its successor electoral district was Châteauguay-Laprairie.

However, Châteauguay-Laprairie only existed for one election.  Châteauguay was re-created for the 1944 election.

In the change from the 2001 to the 2011 electoral map, it lost Sainte-Catherine to the newly created Sanguinet electoral district.

Geography 
It consists of the municipalities of:
 Châteauguay
 Léry
 Mercier
 Saint-Isidore

It also consists of the First Nation reserve of:
 Kahnawake

Linguistic demographics 
 Francophone: 72.3%
 Anglophone: 20.9%
 Allophone: 6.8%

Members of the Legislative Assembly / National Assembly

Electoral results

^ Change based on redistributed results. Coalition Avenir change is from Action démocratique

* Result compared to UFP

References

External links
Information
 Elections Quebec

Election results
 Election results (National Assembly)
 Election results (QuébecPolitique)

Maps
 2011 map (PDF)
 2001 map (Flash)
2001–2011 changes (Flash)
1992–2001 changes (Flash)
 Electoral map of Montérégie
 Quebec electoral map, 2011

Châteauguay
Quebec provincial electoral districts